Buddhi Karna Raya  (Nepali : बुद्धिकर्ण राय  ) 
was the last Limbu overlord king of Limbuwan. He was killed by the forces of Gorkhali king Prithvi Narayan Shah in AD 1774. The Limbuwan lands where he was king or overlord king were between Saptakoshi River to Kankai River covering present day three districts: Sunsari, Morang and parts of Jhapa. After Buddhi Karna's death the later kings in Limbuwan acknowledged the overlordship of the Gurkha King. It was about the time of Buddhi Karna's death that the Gorkha Kingdom was transformed into Nepal. His death was connected with the Limbuwan–Gorkha war.

Rise of Budhhi Karna
After the assassination of Kama Datta Sen, Buddhi Karna came to Bijaypur and became the last Limbu king (Rai) of Morang and Subba of Limbuwan. On hearing of the death of King Kama Datta Sen, all the states that made up Limbuwan and their allies split up. The kings of Limbuwan no longer had allegiance to Buddhi Karna. He needed able ministers and chiefs to assist him in ruling Morang and all of Limbuwan. He sent people to look for King (Hang) Shamo Hang Chemjong of Miklung Bodhey Kingdom to help him.

Death of Budhhi Karna 
He was tricked into coming to Bijaypur- (Limbuwan) present day Dharan for a negotiation, then killed by the agents of Gorkha Kingdom King Prithvi Narayan Shah in AD 1773, Budhhi Karna Khebang's soul is believed to have wandered around the area of his tomb (Budha Subba Temple) around Bijaypur and was said to be a friendly and helpful spirit. Then local Limbu people started worshiping the soul as an old Limbu king (Hang) believing it to bring good luck. In Limbu language Hang means King.

See also
 Limbuwan Gorkha War
 History of Limbuwan

References

Bibliography
 

Year of birth missing
Year of death missing
Nepalese monarchs
Limbu people
People of the Nepalese unification